Schoop's Hamburgers is a 1950s-style hamburger restaurant and diner with 18 locations in northwestern Indiana and the southern Chicago suburbs. The first restaurant was opened in Hammond, Indiana, in 1948. The chain started in 1984 in Munster.

In popular culture
In August 2008, Barack Obama made a campaign stop at a Schoop's restaurant in Portage, Indiana, during his campaign for the presidency in 2008. During his visit, Obama ate one french fry and ordered four hamburgers.

See also

 List of diners
 List of hamburger restaurants

References

External links
 Official website

Hamburger restaurants
Restaurant chains in the United States
Restaurants in Indiana
Hammond, Indiana
Restaurants established in 1948
1948 establishments in Indiana
American companies established in 1984